Lichuan may refer to the following locations:

 Lichuan, Hubei, county-level city of the Enshi Tujia and Miao Autonomous Prefecture, Hubei
 Lichuan railway station
 Lichuan County, Fuzhou, Jiangxi
 Lichuan, Shanxi, town in and subdivision of Zezhou County, Shanxi

See also
 Li Chuan Yun (1980–), violinist